Duel on the Mississippi is a 1955 American Western film directed by William Castle and starring Lex Barker and Patricia Medina.

Plot
Andre Tulane (Barker), descendant of a plantation family in 1820 Louisiana, is bound to Lili Scarlet (Medina), a gambling-ship queen due to his debts. Together, they face off against river pirates (led by her former fiancé (Stevens) who take control of the boat.

Cast
 Lex Barker as André Tulane
 Patricia Medina as Lili Scarlet
 Warren Stevens as Hugo Marat
 Craig Stevens as René LaFarge
 John Dehner as Jules Tulane
 Ian Keith as Jacques Scarlet
 Chris Alcaide as Anton
 John Mansfield as Louie
 Celia Lovsky as Celeste Tulane
 Lou Merrill as Georges Gabriel (as Lou Merrill)
 Mel Welles as Sheriff

References

External links

1955 films
1955 Western (genre) films
American Western (genre) films
Films directed by William Castle
Films set on ships
Films about gambling
Columbia Pictures films
1950s English-language films
1950s American films